The Morane-Saulnier AN or MoS.31 C.2 was a French two seat fighter prototype of the 1910s that resulted in the development of several other unsuccessful Morane-Saulnier prototypes.

Development

Completed in late 1918, the AN was a two-seat fighter designed to use an unorthodox Bugatti U-16 engine. Large and with equal span wings, it was a two-bay biplane with a monocoque fuselage.

First tested in late October 1918, the AN was bested by the SEA 4 and Breguet 17 it was competing against particularly in terms of rate of climb, however it showed sufficient promise that a number of variants were developed. It was ordered into production but never entered service as the SEA and Breguet were already entering service and the end of the First World War curtained production requirements.

Variants
 Morane-Saulnier AN - prototype with 450 hp Bugatti U-16 engine and radiator in leading edge of wing. 
 Morane-Saulnier ANB - modification of prototype with Lamblin radiator.
 Morane-Saulnier ANL - First flown in 1919, the ANL had a 400 hp Liberty L-12 engine. 
 Morane-Saulnier ANR - Also flown in 1919, the ANR had a 450 hp Renault 12Kb engine as well as a rear-mounted Vickers gun. 
 Morane-Saulnier ANS - Again making its début in 1919, the ANS was the final incarnation of the AN series. Equipped with a 530 hp Salmson 18Z 18-cylinder radial. Showed promise at testing, however no further production took place.
MoS.31 C.2 Military designation for AN and ANB.
MoS.32 C.2 Military designation for ANL.
MoS.33 C.2 Military designation for ANR.
MoS.34 C.2 Military designation for ANS.

Specifications (AN)

References

Citations

Bibliography

Further reading

1910s French fighter aircraft
AN
Aircraft first flown in 1918